Men's 200m races for athletes with cerebral palsy at the 2004 Summer Paralympics were held in the Athens Olympic Stadium between 20 & 26 September. Events were held in four disability classes.

T35

The T35 event consisted of a single race. It was won by Teboho Mokgalagadi, representing .

Final Round
26 Sept. 2004, 21:05

T36

The T36 event consisted of a single race. It was won by So Wa Wai, representing .

Final Round
26 Sept. 2004, 18:00

T37

The T37 event consisted of 2 heats and a final. It was won by Matt Slade, representing .

1st Round

Heat 1
20 Sept. 2004, 10:10

Heat 2
20 Sept. 2004, 10:16

Final Round
21 Sept. 2004, 17:45

T38

The T38 event consisted of 2 heats and a final. It was won by Tim Sullivan, representing .

1st Round

Heat 1
23 Sept. 2004, 10:20

Heat 2
23 Sept. 2004, 10:26

Final Round
24 Sept. 2004, 17:00

References

M